Losing Sleep is the debut studio album from pop rock band Parachute. It debuted at number 40 on the Billboard 200 and debuted at number two on the Digital Albums Chart in the United States.

Critical reception

Kaj Roth of Melodic gave high praise to the songs for being "catchy and groovy and shouts out longevity", singling out the single "She Is Love" as being an example of "many future hit singles that will conquer the air waves from now on." AllMusic's Andrew Leahey noted how Shanks' "polished" production and the use of "thicker harmonies and gauzy, synthesized string sections" throughout the track listing speak of the band's mainstream aspirations, concluding that "ambition is good for any young band, and Parachute is talented enough to warrant the starry-eyed approach."

Track listing

Charts

Personnel
Parachute
 Will Anderson - lead vocals, guitar, piano
 Johnny Stubblefield - drums, percussion
 Alex Hargrave - bass
 Kit French - saxophone, keyboards, percussion
 Nate McFarland - lead guitar, backing vocals

Additional personnel
 John Shanks - guitar
 Mark Goldenberg - electric guitar
 George Stanford - trombone
 Daniel Clarke - keyboards
 Charles Judge - keyboards
 Ken Chastain - percussion
 Jeff Rothschild - programming

References

External links
 Losing Sleep on Parachute's Official Website

2009 debut albums
Parachute (band) albums
Albums produced by John Shanks